Koduthu Vaithaval is a 1963 Indian Tamil-language film directed by P. Neelakantan. The film stars M. G. Ramachandran, M. R. Radha and E. V. Saroja. It was released on 9 February 1963.

Plot 

Very disadvantaged from her birth, the unfortunate Meenakshi sees her existence darkening when she is forced to marry, by her foster mother, a simple-minded man, Murugan. The obnoxious cruel mother so acts, to take revenge for her young brother, Manickum, a hooligan, arrested for murder and that she wanted at all costs to marry him to the poor Meenakshi, who just refused. She ignores that she has just picked up the chance of a lifetime, nevertheless. Indeed, hiding behind this husband, ragged, quite dirty, is the billionaire Selvam, victim, some time previously, of an assassination attempt, that left him amnesic. Later, he recovers completely, but remembers Meenakshi no more and resumes his previous life, when he was betrothed to Nalini. As for Meenakshi, far from given up, is going to fight to restore the truth, which apparently, pleases hardly everybody, in particular, the sponsor of the murder, Jambulingam, Nalini's father. From his part, Selvam is going to lead its investigation, helped by good Natarajan, Nalini's elder brother.

Cast 
 M. G. Ramachandran as Selvam
 E. V. Saroja as Meenakshi
 L. Vijayalakshmi as Nalini
 M. R. Radha as Jambulingam
 K. A. Thangavelu as Natarajan
 S. A. Ashokan as Manickam
 M. V. Rajamma as Visalakshi
 G. Sakunthala as Sarasu alias Saraswathi
 M. S. Sundari Bai as Manickam's elder sister
 C. R. Parthiban
 Senthamarai

Soundtrack 
The music was composed by K. V. Mahadevan.

Reception 
Kanthan of Kalki praised Neelakantan's direction and dialogues, saying the film would no doubt be a crowd-pleaser.

References

External links 
 

1960s Tamil-language films
1963 films
Films directed by P. Neelakantan
Films scored by K. V. Mahadevan